John H. Buckeridge (1857–1934) was an English-born Australian architect, who built about sixty churches in Queensland and is also remembered for remodelling the interior of the Macquarie era church of St James', King Street, Sydney.

Life
John Hingeston Buckeridge was born 1857 in Oxford, England, the son of the architect, Charles Buckeridge, and his wife, Anne.  He attended at Magdalen College, Oxford, and studied architecture under J. L. Pearson.

Buckeridge married Ada and had thirteen children, of whom his eldest son, Stanley, was killed at Lone Pine in World War I. Buckeridge himself served in the Artists' Rifles from 1874 to 1878.

Buckeridge died on 25 June 1934 at his residence, 8 Garfield Street, Carlton, Sydney. He was privately cremated at Woronora crematorium on 26 June 1934.

Architectural career
Buckeridge migrated to Australia in 1886.  In 1887 he went to Queensland by invitation of William Webber, third Bishop of Brisbane, was appointed the Diocesan Architect for the Anglican Diocese of Brisbane and held that position until 1902. During that period he designed about sixty wooden churches for parishes in southern Queensland. Remaining examples include Christ Church, Milton, which was built as a temporary replacement for the earlier stone church, damaged in a storm of 1890. The small Arts and Crafts style building is still in use and has a heritage listing.
  
Of Buckeridge's domestic architecture, at least two examples remain, the rectory of St Mary's Anglican Church, Kangaroo Point and the former Rectory of St Andrew's Church, South Brisbane, designed in 1887 and extended by Buckeridge in 1892.

Buckeridge's more substantial churches include the stone church of St Luke's Anglican Church, Toowoomba. Christ Church Anglican Church, Bundaberg, was designed in the 1890s but not constructed until 1926.  It is of dark brick, in the English Gothic style and has a tower and spire. Buckeridge also built the Quetta Memorial Church, now All Souls and St Bartholomew's Memorial Cathedral, on Thursday Island, in memory of the lives lost in the wreck of the RMS Quetta.

In 1892 Buckeridge commenced work in Sydney, remodelling the interior of St James' Church, King Street, removing the galleries, creating an apse and a raised platform for the choir.  At this time he was also employed on work at Christ Church Cathedral, Newcastle. This building, one of the largest cathedrals in Australia, was designed by John Horbury Hunt and commenced in 1883. In 1902 Buckeridge introduced a number of structural details to support the roof. In 1907 Buckeridge became an architect with the New South Wales Department of Public Works, remaining in that position until his retirement.

List of works
 1887: former rectory of St Andrew's Anglican Church, South Brisbane, now relocated at 112 Airlie Road, Pullenvale
 1888–1889: St Agnes Anglican Church, Esk
 1889: Gresham Hotel, on the corner of Adelaide and Creek Streets, Brisbane
 1889: Rectory at St Mary's Anglican Church, Kangaroo Point
 1889–1890: Lady Bowen Hospital, Spring Hill
 1890: Grandstands at the Eagle Farm Racecourse, Eagle Farm 
 1891: Christ Church, Milton
 1891–1892: Holy Trinity Parish Hall, Fortitude Valley
 1892: St Luke's Anglican Church, Toowoomba
 1893-1893: All Souls and St Bartholomew's Cathedral Church, Thursday Island (known as the Quetta Memorial Church)
 1899: Christ Church, Childers
 1901: renovations to St James' Church, Sydney
 1901: Memorial Church of St John the Evangelist, Mundoolun
 1901–1902: rectory at St Agnes Anglican Church, Esk

Legacy 
Drawings, plans, correspondence and photographs from Buckeridge are held in the Fryer Library, The University of Queensland.

See also
 Architecture of Australia 
 Francis Greenway
 Edmund Blacket 
 John Horbury Hunt

References

External links 

1857 births
1934 deaths
Architects from Queensland
Gothic Revival architects
Australian ecclesiastical architects
English emigrants to Australia
Architects from Oxford
Alumni of Magdalen College, Oxford
Artists' Rifles soldiers